The 1961–62 Liga Gimel season saw 103 clubs competing in 9 regional divisions for promotion to Liga Bet.

Beitar Kiryat Shmona, Bnei Nazareth, Beitar Binyamina, Hapoel Dora Netanya, Beitar Kiryat Ono, Hapoel Giv'atayim, ASA Jerusalem, Hapoel Kiryat Gat, Hapoel Ofakim  won their regional divisions and promoted to Liga Bet.

Second placed club, Harari Tel Aviv are also promoted.

Galilee Division
Beitar Kiryat Shmona - Promoted to Liga Bet
Hapoel Ayelet HaShahar
Hapoel Dan
Beitar Safed 
Hapoel Kfar Giladi
Hapoel Hulata
Hapoel Hatzor
Hapoel Neot Mordechai

Valleys Division
Bnei Nazareth - Promoted to Liga Bet
Maccabi Afula
Hapoel Sde Nahum
Hapoel Ein Harod 
Hapoel Beit She'an
Hapoel Neve Eitan
Hapoel Geva
Hapoel Mishmar HaEmek

Haifa Division
Beitar Binyamina - Promoted to Liga Bet
Hapoel Geva HaCarmel
Hapoel Tirat HaCarmel 
Hapoel Migdal HaEmek 
Hapoel Shlomi
Al-Amal Acre
Beitar Acre
Hapoel Ma'alot
Hapoel Ein HaMifratz
Maccabi Kfar Ata
Beitar Kfar Ata
Shefa-'Amr Club
Ahwa Shefa-'Amr

Samaria Division
Hapoel Dora Netanya - Promoted to Liga Bet
F.C. Even Yehuda 
Hapoel Beit Eliezer
Hapoel Kfar Yona
Hapoel Haogen
Maccabi Beit Lid
Hapoel Kadima 
Hapoel Mishmar HaSharon/Kfar Monash
Hapoel Tel Mond
Hapoel Karkur
Hapoel HaSharon HaTzfoni
Hapoel Beit Yitzhak/Sha'ar Hefer
Beitar Zvi Netanya
Hapoel Shefayim

Dan Division
Beitar Kiryat Ono - Promoted to Liga Bet
Hapoel Ramat HaSharon
Maccabi Herzliya 
HaKochav Or Yehuda
Hapoel Beit Dagan
Beitar Beit Dagan
Hapoel Zeitan
Hapoel Mahane Israel
Beitar Mahane Israel
Hapoel Shikun HaMizrah
Hapoel Zarnuga
Beitar Yehud
Beitar Rishon LeZion
Hapoel Hadar Ramatayim

Tel Aviv Division
Hapoel Giv'atayim - Promoted to Liga Bet
Harari Tel Aviv - Promoted to Liga Bet
Hapoel Ezra
Beitar Ezra 
Hapoel Jaffa
Hapoel Kfar Shalem
Hapoel Pardes Katz
Hapoel Sha'ariya
Beitar Sha'ariya
Beitar Ganei Tikva
Beitar Petah Tikva
Beitar Bnei Brak
Hapoel Rosh Ha'ayin
Beitar Ramat Gan

Jerusalem Division
ASA Jerusalem - Promoted to Liga Bet
Hapoel Shmuel Ramla
Hapoel HaTzafon Jerusalem
Hapoel HaDarom Jerusalem
Hapoel Shimahom Beit Shemesh
Beitar Beit Shemesh
Hapoel Givat Brenner
Hapoel Yehoshua
Hapoel Zichronot
Beitar Ekron

Central Division
Hapoel Kiryat Gat - Promoted to Liga Bet
Maccabi Kiryat Gat
Hapoel Ashdod
Hapoel Sde Uziyahu
Hapoel Beit Ezra
Maccabi Ashdod 
Hapoel Gedera
Hapoel Kiryat Malakhi
Hapoel Azrikam
Hapoel Gat
Maccabi Kfar Gvirol 
Hof Ashkelon
Hapoel Palmahim 1

1. Hapoel Palmahim folded at the beginning of the season, and were suspended by the Israel Football Association.

Negev Division
Hapoel Ofakim - Promoted to Liga Bet
Hapoel Nir Yitzhak
Hapoel Be'eri
Hapoel Kfar Yeruham
Hapoel Shoval
Hapoel Shelahim
Hapoel Mitzpe Ramon
Hapoel Dimona
Hapoel Patish\Maslul

See also
1961–62 Liga Leumit
1961–62 Liga Alef
1961–62 Liga Bet

References
50 Games in the opening of liga gimel (Page 4), Hadshot HaSport, 10 November 1961, archive.football.co.il 

Liga Gimel seasons
4